Oliver Green Traphagen (3 September 1854 – 21 October 1932) was an American architect who designed many notable buildings in Duluth, Minnesota, during the late 19th century and in the Territory of Hawaii during the early 20th century. Among his most famous landmarks are the Oliver G. Traphagen House in Duluth, called the Redstone, and the Moana Hotel in Honolulu, both of which are on the National Register of Historic Places, as are several other buildings he designed.

Biography
He was born on 3 September 1854 in Tarrytown, New York.

In the 1870s Traphagen moved to St. Paul, Minnesota, with his parents where he worked as a carpenter, and later as an apprentice to the architect George Wirth. He moved north to Duluth in 1882, and soon became one of the city's first major architects. The 1880s were boom times in Duluth; the population was 30,000 in 1887 compared with 13,000 in 1883. Over the next fifteen years, either on his own or in partnership with Wirth (1884–1886) and later Francis W. Fitzpatrick (1889–1896), Traphagen designed buildings for both public and private owners, such as the First National Bank (1888), Turner Hall (1888), Wieland Block (1889), City Hall and Jail (1889), Fire Station No. 1 (1889), First Presbyterian Church (1891), and Duluth Central High School (1892). Many of Traphagen's designs show the influence of the Richardsonian Romanesque style that was popular at the time. Noted Duluth architect Frederick German worked as a draftsman for Traphagen and Fitzpatrick during this time.

Because his daughter's health required a warmer climate, the family relocated to the soon-to-be-annexed Republic of Hawaii in October 1897. Thanks to his previous work in Duluth he soon became "the most prolific and highly regarded architect in town." He designed the first building in the islands with a passenger elevator, the Judd Building (1898); the first hotel on Waikiki Beach, the Moana (1901); and the first public crematory in the Islands, at Oahu Cemetery (1906). As in Duluth, he also designed public works, such as the Kakaako Pumping Station (1900), Palama Fire Station (1901), and the Hawaiian State Archives Building (1906).

Two of his more exceptional buildings have not survived: the classical-style Hackfeld & Co. building downtown (1902) and the four-story James B. Castle home on Waikiki Beach. Among the last buildings he designed in Hawaii was the Punahou School president's home, which celebrated its 100th anniversary in December 2007. In 1907, he moved to Alameda, California, where he retired in 1925.

He died on 21 October 1932 in Alameda, California.

Projects

Pastoret Flats/Kozy Bar & Apartments, 129-131 East 1st Street, Duluth, MN, circa 1887 - Heavily damaged by fire on November 15, 2010 - (future and restoration uncertain)
Christian H. Oppel Block, 115 E Superior St, Duluth, Minnesota, circa 1885. Attributed to Traphagen. Demolished circa 1987.
Wirth Building, 13 W Superior St, Duluth, Minnesota, 1886. Attributed to Traphagen.
First National Bank, Duluth, Minnesota, 1888. Demolished 1959
Turner Hall, 601 E Third St, Duluth, Minnesota, 1888. Destroyed by fire 1890 
Wieland Block,  Duluth, Minnesota, 1889
Former Duluth City Hall and Jail, 132 and 126 E Superior St, Duluth, Minnesota, 1889
Fire Station No. 1, N Corner of 1st Ave E and Third St, Duluth, Minnesota, 1889. Traphagen & Fitzpatrick
Boiler House and smokestack, August J. Fitger's Brewery, 600 E Superior St, Duluth, Minnesota, 1890. Traphagen & Fitzpatrick
Chester Terrace, 1210–1232 E First St, Duluth, Minnesota, 1890. Traphagen & Fitzpatrick
First Presbyterian Church, 300 E Second St, Duluth, Minnesota, 1891. Traphagen & Fitzpatrick
Duluth Central High School, 215 N. 1st Ave E., Duluth, Minnesota, 1891-92. Emmet S. Palmer and Lucien P. Hall, architects, and Traphagen.
Munger Terrace, 405 Mesabi Ave, Duluth, Minnesota, 1891-92. Traphagen & Fitzpatrick
Oliver G. Traphagen House, 1511 E Superior St, Duluth, Minnesota, 1892. Traphagen & Fitzpatrick
Torrey Building, 314-316 W Superior St, Duluth, Minnesota, 1892. Traphagen & Fitzpatrick
Duluth Board of Trade, 301 W First St, Duluth, Minnesota, 1894-95. Traphagen & Fitzpatrick
Judd Building, corner of Merchant and Fort Sts, Honolulu, Hawaii, 1898
Kakaako Pumping Station, 653 Ala Moana Blvd, Honolulu, Hawaii, 1900
Moana Hotel, 2365 Kalakaua Ave, Honolulu, Hawaii, 1901 
Palama Fire Station, 879 N King St, Oahu (1901)
President's Home at the Punahou School, 1907
Kainalu, the beach house of James Bicknell Castle in Waikiki, 1902; demolished 1959
244-252 California Street, San Francisco, California, 1908

Gallery

See also 

 Anton Werner Lignell – Duluth-based architect

Notes

 Wilcox, Gaylord (1972). "Business and Buildings: Downtown Honolulu's Old Fashioned Block," Hawaiian Journal of History 6:3-27.
Hawaiian Time Machine

1854 births
1932 deaths
19th-century American architects
20th-century American architects
People from Tarrytown, New York
People from Duluth, Minnesota
Architects from New York (state)
Architects from Minnesota
Architects from Hawaii